Michael Ray Aquino is a former intelligence officer in the police force of the Philippines. He was accused of involvement in a 2000 political murder, and more recently was convicted of helping to transmit classified information from the United States to opposition leaders in the Philippines.

Aquino's Philippine-related career included serving as Deputy Directory of the Intelligence Group, and as senior superintendent of the Presidential Anti-Organized Crime Task Force (now defunct). He served under President Joseph Estrada, and remained politically loyal to Estrada after Gloria Macapagal Arroyo rose to power. In 2001, he and Cesar Mancao were charged in connection with the killing of Bubby Dacer, a former public relations official for Joseph Estrada. Aquino then left the Philippines and moved to New York.

In March 2005, Aquino was arrested for overstaying his visa. He contacted his friend Leandro Aragoncillo, a Philippine-born security specialist at the White House; however, Aragoncillo's efforts on Aquino's behalf eventually led to Aragoncillo being investigated by the Federal Bureau of Investigation. In the course of that investigation, evidence of espionage against the United States Government was uncovered. Aquino was then accused of helping Aragoncillo transmit classified United States documents regarding President Gloria Macapagal Arroyo to her opponents in the Philippines, including both Joseph Estrada and current opposition leader Panfilo Lacson, who had been Aquino's superior in the police force. Under an eventual plea-bargain agreement, Aquino entered a plea of guilty to illegal possession of classified documents, but avoided the more serious charge of espionage that Leandro Aragoncillo received.

Aquino faced a jail sentence of between 70 and 87 months plus a $250,000 fine. On July 17, 2007, he was sentenced to six years and four months in prison by U.S. District Judge William H. Walls.  Federal prosecutors had sought the maximum 10-year term.

References

External links
Manila Times article
MSNBC article
ABC-CBN article
Newsday article
CI Center page on Aragoncillo/Aquino case

Filipino police officers
Filipino spies
Year of birth missing (living people)
Living people